This is a survey of the postage stamps and postal history of Djibouti, known as the French Territory of the Afars and Issas before independence, and as French Somaliland before that.

Djibouti is a country in the Horn of Africa, bordered by Eritrea to the north, Ethiopia to the west and south, and Somalia to the southeast. The remainder of the border is formed by the Red Sea and the Gulf of Aden.

First stamps

After the French administration was moved from Obock to Djibouti in 1894, stamps of Obock were overprinted DJ or Djibouti.

A set of definitives inscribed Protectorat Côte des Somalis / Djibouti was issued in 1894.

French Somali Coast

From 1902 stamps inscribed Cote Francaise des Somalis were issued for the French Somali Coast.

French Territory of the Afars and Issas

In July 1967 the name of the territory was changed to the French Territory of the Afars and Issas and the first stamps under the new name were issued on 21 August 1967.

Independence
The territory obtained independence from France as the Republic of Djibouti on 27 June 1977 and the first stamps of the new republic were issued on that date.

See also 
Postage stamps and postal history of Obock

References

Further reading 
 Dubois, Colette. Djibouti au regard de ses timbres-poste, 1893-1977: images d'altérité, images de propagande. Paris: ARESAE, 1998, 47p. 
 Kingsley, Robert T. The Early Issues of French Somaliland. In: American Philatelist. April 1991.
 Schreiber, Michael. Early Stamps of Djibouti. In: Linn's Stamp News. June 15, 1992.
 Torrance, A.R. French Somali Coast: The Postal History 1939-45. Abernethy, Perth: Chavril Press, 1993? , 24p. 
 Tristant, Henri. Histoire Postale de la Côte des Somalis. Paris: "Le Monde des philatélistes", 1975. Vol 1:  Avant-propos, rappel historique et économique, Obock et Djibouti; Vol. 2: Timbres et oblitérations de la Côte des Somalis, 1902-1967; Vol. 3: Poste maritime, poste aérienne, contrôle postal, courrier éthiopien, documents

External links

French Somali Coast timeline.
http://www.zum.de/whkmla/region/eastafrica/cotedessomalis19391977.html
1913 Log of Milanko Raitchevitch Archived here.

Communications in Djibouti
Djibouti
History of Djibouti